Thomas Ian Murray Ward  (29 June 1907 – 6 April 1986) was a Scottish freestyle sport wrestler who competed for Great Britain in the 1936 Summer Olympics. In 1936 he competed in the freestyle light heavyweight tournament. At the 1938 Empire Games he won the bronze medal in the freestyle light heavyweight class.

References

External links
 

1907 births
1986 deaths
Olympic wrestlers of Great Britain
Wrestlers at the 1936 Summer Olympics
British male sport wrestlers
Wrestlers at the 1938 British Empire Games
Commonwealth Games bronze medallists for Scotland
Commonwealth Games medallists in wrestling
Medallists at the 1938 British Empire Games